Galatro is a comune (municipality) in the Province of Reggio Calabria in the Italian region Calabria, located about  southwest of Catanzaro and about  northeast of Reggio Calabria.

Located in a very beautiful area of Calabria, it is home to a renowned Spa where treatments are carried out. Galatro's origin can be ascribed to the medieval period, and over the centuries it was repeatedly destroyed by violent earthquakes (the last that of 1906). The economy is primarily driven by the exploitation of hot spring, although there are many farms and a few small industries. San Nicola di Bari, celebrated on December 6, is the patron saint of Galatro.

The history of terme di Sant'Elia is linked to various monastic orders that, from the 8th to the 18th century, occupied with the care of the sick using the spring water that they knew and appreciated the therapeutic properties. The first spa was started at the end of 1800.

Type of mineral waters:
Sulphur water-iodic-salty

Listed diseases: 
 Otorhinolaryngological Diseases and respiratory tract
 Gynecological diseases
 Rheumatic diseases
 Skin diseases

The water (37 °C) are sulphurous-salty-iodine indicated for the treatment of diseases, inflammatory Arthro, otorhinolaryngological, gynaecological, dermatological and respiratory. The treatments include baths, mud baths, inhalations, irrigations. The spa complex is gearing up for an aesthetic and functional rehabilitation. The resort is situated at the foot of the Sila and just a few kilometres from the Tyrrhenian coast: natural environment, for sure charm, guarantees a pleasant and restful stay.

Church of San Nicola di Bari
The church dedicated to Saint Nicholas, patron saint of Galatro, is the Church. Located next to the Town Hall and contains ancient works of great value: the eighteenth-century central altar produced by the school of Gagini and the 15th-century marble statue of Saint Nicholas. San Nicola di marmo plaster, fifteenth-century statue. This statue comes from the Church of s. Salvatore della Chilena. This was an Abbey Church which stood in what is now the district end up crushing of Galatro. The base of the statue holding the santo is adorned with bas-reliefs of great artistic interest.

Church Maria SS. of the mountain
It is located in the rione of Montebello. Was built in 1856 by Mgr. Mincioni. In this church are seeing the wooden statue of the Madonna of the mountain carved by De Lorenzo and stuccheo-Baroque altar likely work of Morani.

Church Maria SS. of Carmel
It is a small church and is located in via Garibaldi. Inside, in addition to the beautiful statue of the Madonna del Carmine, located on the central altar, the statue of San Francesco di Paola, Santa Rita and Santa Filomena.

Typical Produce
Bergamotto di Reggio Calabria (PDO)
Bergamot essential oil is produced in the thin coastal strip that stretches between Villa San Giovanni and Gioiosa Jonica, between the Ionian and the Tyrrhenian Sea, and includes a number of towns in the province of Reggio Calabria, Bergamot name derives from the Turkish "Beg-armudi," but of the Lord, for his resemblance to the PEAR bergamot. The origin of the citrus is uncertain: many argue that derives from mutation to another citrus species; others believe it was imported from the Canary Islands by Christopher Columbus; However, the most suitable and unique habitat for its cultivation, the only place where fruit well, is the province of Reggio Calabria. The first bergamotteto was implanted near the town in 1750. At that time the essence was extracted manually by pressing the peel of the fruit and making it absorb from natural sponges, placed in special containers.

Bergamot essential oil is an indispensable product in different industries: in perfumery, secures the aromatic bouquet of fragrances and harmonizes the other essences contained, extolling the notes of freshness and fragrance; is an excellent ingredient for the sunscreen, although it should be remembered that the pure essence should not be applied to the skin during sun exposure; It is used in the pharmaceutical industry for its antiseptic and antibacterial power; Finally, it is also used in the food industry as flavouring of liquors, tea, sweets, candies, ice cream and soft drinks.  You should preserve the essence in cool and in the dark.

The fruit collection, made from November to March, should be performed with special precautions, to avoid damaging the bark, from which oil is extracted. Machining centres, the fruits are left to rest for several days before being submerged in water for a useful cleaning and sorting, and then are passed to the peelers, for extracting a watery emulsion that is retrieved through subsequent centrifugation.

Clementines of Calabria (PGI)
The production area covers the entire territory of the region Calabria clementine cultivation has spread after 1950 in Calabria, where this citrus has found its natural habitat: a mild climate and constant that allows the fruit to fully developing its extrinsic and intrinsic quality characteristics and to ripen very early, in early October.

The Clementine di Calabria is refreshing and diuretic and has a high content of sugars available. In the kitchen, can be eaten plain or used to prepare juices, syrups, jams, sorbets. The fruit is also used in cosmetics in the preparation of toning lotions and masks to skin.  The Clementine is kept in the refrigerator, where it will keep for weeks.

Clementine, plants grow well and produce top quality fruit regularly and in large quantities.  They require adequate cultivation techniques as the clementine tree is very sensitive and delicate in the first years of life.  The Clementine di Calabria is not subjected to any kind of industrial processing and may be marketed in bulk or packaged, in which case it is subject to selection, calibration and dithering.

Capocollo di Calabria
Calabrian salami origins date back to the cultural glories of Magna Greece, while historical records describe the workings of pigmeat since the 17th century. In more recent times, the production of sausages is attested by statistics released in censuses of Gioacchino Murat, in the early 19th century. Among the most illustrious admirers of meats of this region is Giacomo Casanova, who is said to have tasted with particular enjoyment during a trip to Calabria, judging them among the best he had ever tried.

The taste, intense and delicate at the same time, is enhanced by combining with well-structured red wines; the capocollo is typically eaten as an appetizer or as a snack, with the traditional local sourdough bread, baked in a wood-fired oven.  It keeps perfectly for about a year, in fresh and dry places, where it is traditionally hung from the ceiling to complete the maturation process.

Galatro borders the following municipalities: Fabrizia, Feroleto della Chiesa, Giffone, Grotteria, Laureana di Borrello, Mammola, Maropati, San Pietro di Caridà.

Demographic evolution

References

Cities and towns in Calabria